The enzyme dihydrocoumarin hydrolase (EC 3.1.1.35) catalyzes the reaction

dihydrocoumarin + H2O  melilotate

This enzyme belongs to the family of hydrolases, specifically those acting on carboxylic ester bonds.  The systematic name is dihydrocoumarin lactonohydrolase. This enzyme participates in fluorene degradation.

References

 

EC 3.1.1
Enzymes of unknown structure